Mitchella repens (partridge berry, or squaw vine (no longer used)) is the best known plant in the genus Mitchella. 
It is a creeping prostrate herbaceous woody shrub occurring in North America belonging to the madder family (Rubiaceae).

Naming
Mitchella repens is one of the many species first described by Carl Linnaeus. Its species name is the Latin adjective repens, which means "creeping". Common names for Mitchella repens include partridge berry (or partridgeberry), squaw berry (no longer used), two-eyed berry, running fox, and Noon kie oo nah yeah (in the Mohawk language).

Description
The partridge berry is an evergreen plant growing as a non-climbing vine, no taller than 6 cm tall with creeping stems 15 to 30 cm long. The evergreen, dark green, shiny leaves are ovate to cordate in shape. The leaves have a pale yellow midrib. The petioles are short, and the leaves are paired oppositely on the stems. Adventitious roots may grow at the nodes; and rooting stems may branch and root repeatedly, producing loose spreading mats.

The small, trumpet-shaped, axillary flowers are produced in pairs, and each flower pair arises from one common calyx which is covered with fine hairs. Each flower has four white petals, one pistil, and four stamens. Partridge berry is a distylous taxon. The plants have flowers with either long pistils and short stamens (long-styled flowers, called pins) or short pistils and long stamens (short-styled flowers, called thrums). The two style morphs are genetically determined, so the pollen from one morph does not fertilize the other morph, resulting in a form of heteromorphic self-incompatibility.

The ovaries of the twin flowers fuse together, so that there are two flowers for each berry. The two bright red spots on each berry are vestiges of this process. The fruit ripens between July and October, and may persist through the winter. The fruit is a drupe containing up to eight seeds. The fruits are never abundant. They may be part of the diets of several birds, such as ruffed grouse, sharp-tailed grouse, northern bobwhite, and wild turkey. They are also consumed by foxes, white-footed mice, and skunks. The foliage is occasionally consumed by white-tailed deer.

The common reproduction is vegetative, with plants forming spreading colonies.

Distribution and habitat
The species is dispersed throughout eastern North America, from south Eastern Canada south to Florida and Texas, and to Guatemala. It is found growing in dry or moist woods, along stream banks and on sandy slopes.

Cultivation and uses
Mitchella repens is cultivated for its ornamental red berries and shiny, bright green foliage.  It is grown as a creeping ground cover in shady locations. It is rarely propagated for garden use by way of seeds but cuttings are easy. The plants have been widely collected for Christmas decorations, and over collecting has impacted some local populations negatively. First Nations women made a tea from the leaves and berries that was consumed during childbirth. The plants are sometimes grown in terrariums. The scarlet berries are edible but rather tasteless, with a faint flavour of wintergreen, resembling cranberries (to which they are not closely related). Vaccinium vitis-idaea may be referred to by the same common name, "Newfoundland Partridgeberry" or "lingonberry" but is a different species.

References

Mitchelleae
Berries
Flora of North America
Flora of Asia
Medicinal plants
Plants described in 1753
Taxa named by Carl Linnaeus